Badamlu may refer to:
 Badamlu, East Azerbaijan
 Badamlu, Kerman
 Badamlu, West Azerbaijan